The Puebla sinkhole is located in the town of Santa Maria Zacatepec, Juan C. Bonilla municipality, Puebla, Mexico.

First appearance and developments
Homeowners Magdalena and Heriberto Sánchez reported hearing a loud sound before finding the pit. The couple, who live with their two children, ages 13 and 11, have been forced to flee their modest home, which they had remodelled from 2014 to May 2020 with an investment of MXN $700,000 (US$35,000 at June 2021 exchange rate). Local people believe the sinkhole may be related to what was once a jagüey or artificial pond, in the area, but environmental officials have suggested it may be related to a softening of the soil as a result of overexploitation of the aquifers in the Alto Atoyac sub-basin of the Balsas River basin in southwest Mexico. The sinkhole is filled with water that has strong currents; some people believe the water may come from an underground river. The water almost completely disappears at about 3 or 4 a.m.

The government has warned that tourists should stay away from the area and has prohibited the flying of drones over the area.

See also
Cenote
Cave of Swallows
Zacatón

References

Sinkholes
Sinkholes of Mexico
Landforms of Mexico
Landforms of Puebla
2021 in Mexico